The Palais Kuffner is a city-palace in Vienna that was built for the brewery barons von Kuffner. It is located in the XVI. district Ottakring.

Buildings and structures in Ottakring
Jews and Judaism in Vienna
Kuffner